Sharaabi is a 1984 Indian Hindi comedy drama film produced and directed by Prakash Mehra. This was Mehra's sixth film with Amitabh Bachchan.

Sharaabi stars Amitabh Bachchan and Jaya Prada in lead roles along with Pran, Om Prakash and Ranjeet. The music was composed by Bappi Lahiri. It became a Super hit at the box office.

The film, which was loosely inspired by the 1981 movie Arthur, was remade in Kannada in 1985 as Nee Thanda Kanike with Vishnuvardhan and Jayasudha.

Plot 

Vicky Kapoor is the only son of billionaire industrialist Ammarnath Kapoor who is growing his business and has no time for his son. Munshi Phoolchand friend of Amarnath is a care taker and in lieu of affection for Vicky. Being ignored by his dad regularly, Vicky is inclined towards becoming alcoholic since his childhood days.

Amarnath blames Munshi for Vicky becoming an alcoholic, but Munshi confronts Amarnath by saying that Vicky's mom died bestowing Vicky to him as Amarnath did not even care to visit his dying wife, and his ignorance has made Vicky an alcoholic. As Munshi is about to leave his job, Vicky swears him to stop. Vicky being nice and polite, he sees an orphan kid Anwar, whose mother died recently and kind of adopts him entrusting the school principal and Munshi to take care of his schooling and bringing him up. Now in adulthood. Anwar becomes a police inspector and is still unaware of his secret angel who has helped him to grow into a successful man. Vicky is now a famous alcoholic but very good at heart and helps random poor and ill children. He helps Abdul, a butcher, and provides medical aid for his kid.

He meets Meena, a professional dancer, a daughter of a poor blind man and falls in love with her. Her agent Natwar is greedy in gaining Vicky's money and harasses her and her blind father but doing petty theft of the gifts given by Vicky to her. When Amarnath tries to arrange Vicky's marriage he disagrees and Amarnath insults him by stating that poor girl won't marry him. Vicky insults his father in front of all his business and political contacts.

Vicky is framed for being with other girl by Natwar, which makes Amarnath angry and disowns Vicky from his property and money, on which he agrees and Munshi also tags along. Natwar also kidnaps Meena.
Anwar realises that Vicky was his secret angel and invites Vicky and Munshi to stay at his home to which Vicky rejects at first but finally visits his home and sees Meena who was rescued by Anwar. Vicky entrusts Anwar that Meena should stay at Anwar's house till he is financially strong. They spend the night sleeping on the footpath. Next morning when Munshi leaves Vicky to find work so that he can earn money and feed both of them, but he gets involved in an accident and dies. Vicky quits alcohol and meets his father during a meeting and asks him to join him in last rights of Munshi Phoolchand, to which Amarnath denies and angry Vicky leaves by declaring him as an orphan as his rightful father Munshi is dead and his biological father is not concerned in anything apart from work.

One of Amarnath's business partners Govardhandas always wanted his daughter to marry Vicky but is always insulted by Vicky in the past, so Govardhandas meets Natwar and pays him money to separate Vicky and Meena.

Abdul, who was helped by Vicky earlier, finds that his son is missing. Natwar meets him and says that kidnappers have kidnapped his son and has demanded that Abdul kills Meena. Abdul shows the kidnappers the dead body of Meena and they return his son back to him.

Vicky hears the death of Meena and fights with Natwar, where he blames that Abdul was the one who has killed Meena upon Govardhandas' orders.

Meanwhile, Amarnath realizes his mistakes and starts missing Vicky. Desperate to see Vicky, Amarnath starts drinking and his business partner along with Govardhandas takes advantage by taking Amarnath's property under their name and planning to kill Amarnath.

Vicky learns about this and confronts Govardhandas and his henchmen to a fight. Vicky is shot by Natwar on his arm but is rescued by Anwar who then arrests Natwar and Govardhandas. Vicky is helped by all his poor people whom he has helped in the past and nabs the remaining goons. Abdul brings Meena to injured Vicky and Amarnath, stating that Vicky has helped his son in past so he would not kill Vicky's love. Amarnath accepts his mistakes and welcomes Meena in his family.

In the end, Vicky opens a housing complex for the poor and homeless and names it Munshi Phoolchand Nagar.

Cast 

Amitabh Bachchan as Vicky Kapoor
Jaya Prada as Meena
Ranjeet as Natwar Shah
Pran as Rai Sahib Amarnath Kapoor
Om Prakash as Munshi Phoolchand 
Deepak Parashar as Inspector Anwar
Chandrashekhar as Advocate Saxena
Ashalata Wabgaonkar as Mrs. Amarnath Kapoor
Bharat Bhushan as School Master
Suresh Oberoi as Abdul
Mukri as Nathulal
Vikas Anand as Lobo
A. K. Hangal as Meena's Father
Satyen Kappu as Seth Govardhandas,Paper King
Bhushan Tiwari as Mr.Gore
Sunder as Mr. Khaitaan , Cement King
Jankidas as Rustomjee Bandookwala
Viju Khote as Mr.Nahata ,Partner of Liquior Factory 
Smita Patil as guest appearance in the song "Jahan Chaar Yaar Mil Jaye"

Soundtrack
The music of this album is composed by Bappi Lahiri who won the Filmfare Award for Best Music Director. All the songs of the album were hits. The song "Jahan Chaar Yaar" is inspired from Runa Laila's classic Bengali song "Bondhu Teen Din".

Kishore Kumar won his 7th Best Male Playback Singer. Kishore Kumar was only singer nominated for that year for four songs from this album: "De De Pyar De", "Inteha Ho Gayi Intezar Ki", "Log Kehte Hain" and won for the song "Manzilen Apni Jagah Hain" which is a record till date.

Track listing

Awards 

 32nd Filmfare Awards:

Won

 Best Music Director – Bappi Lahiri
 Best Male Playback Singer – Kishore Kumar for "Manzilein Apni Jaga"

Nominated

 Best Film – Prakash Mehra
 Best Director – Prakash Mehra
 Best Actor – Amitabh Bachchan
 Best Actress – Jaya Prada
 Best Lyricist – Anjaan for "Manzilein Apni Jaga"
 Best Lyricist – Anjaan and Prakash Mehra for "Inteha Ho Gayi"
 Best Male Playback Singer – Kishore Kumar for "De De Pyaar De"
Best Male Playback Singer – Kishore Kumar for "Inteha Ho Gayi"
Best Male Playback Singer – Kishore Kumar for "Log Kehte Hai"

References

External links 
 

1984 films
1980s Hindi-language films
Films directed by Prakash Mehra
Films about alcoholism
Films about interclass romance
Hindi films remade in other languages
Films scored by Bappi Lahiri
Indian remakes of American films
1980s romantic comedy-drama films
Indian romantic comedy-drama films
1984 drama films